Dionysius Exiguus's Easter table was constructed in the year 525 by Dionysius Exiguus for the years 532–626. He obtained it from an Easter table attributed to Patriarch Cyril of Alexandria for the years 437–531. The latter was constructed around the year 440 by means of extrapolation from an Alexandrian Easter table constructed around the year 390 by Patriarch Theophilus of Alexandria. The great historical importance of Dionysius' Easter table is twofold: 

 From this Easter table Bede's Easter cycle would ultimately be developed by means of which all future Julian calendar dates of Easter Sunday were determined (as in column G of Dionysius' table); 
 With his Easter table Dionysius introduced in passing the Christian era (see column A of Dionysius' table) which would be developed into a full system for dating historical events by Bede two centuries later.

See also 
 Date of Easter

References
 Georges Declercq: Anno Domini: The Origins of the Christian Era (Turnhout, 2000);

External links
 Nineteen year cycle of Dionysius (original version)
 Dionysius Exiguus' Easter table (modern version)

525 works
Chronology
Easter date